KALB or Kalb may refer to:

People

Bernard Kalb (1922–2023), journalist, media critic and author
Buddy Kalb (born 1938), American singer-songwriter and musician
Cassius D. Kalb, American songwriter and musician 
Danny Kalb (1942–2022), American blues guitarist
Don Kalb, Dutch social anthropologist
Johann de Kalb (1721–1780), German soldier
Klaus Kalb (born 1942), German lichenologist
Marvin Kalb (born 1930), American journalist

Other
the ICAO airport code for Albany International Airport in Albany, New York, United States
KALB-TV, a television station digital channel 35 (virtual channel 5.1) in  Alexandria, Louisiana, United States
KJMJ (580 AM), a radio station in Alexandria, Louisiana, United States which held the call sign KALB from 1935 to 1995
KZMZ (96.9 FM), a radio station in Alexandria, Louisiana, United States which held the call sign KALB-FM from 1947 to 1979
the Banu Kalb, a tribe of Arabia during Muhammad's era
Kalb (term), the Arabic word for "dog"

Surnames from nicknames